Steve Sem-Sandberg (born 16 August 1958) is a Swedish journalist, novelist, non-fiction writer and translator. He made his literary debut in 1976 with the two science fiction novels Sländornas värld and Sökare i dödsskuggan. He was awarded the Dobloug Prize for fiction in 2005.

His 2009 novel, The Emperor of Lies, was awarded the August Prize. It recounts the life of the Łódź ghetto and its leader Chaim Rumkowski in Nazi-occupied Poland during World War II.

Daphne Merkin in the New York Times said that he had succeeded in writing "a freshly felt, fully absorbing novel about the Holocaust," an even more difficult task as he was writing about a known historical figure in Rumkowski. By combining both intimate views and overall history, he conveys an effect "both super-realist and surrealist, in the manner of an animated documentary."

Awards and honours

2005 Dobloug Prize
2013 Jan Michalski Prize for Literature, shortlist, The Emperor of Lies
2016 Prix Médicis etranger, winner, Les élus

Works
Sländornas värld and Sökare i dödsskuggan (1976)
 De ansiktslösa, novel (1987)
 I en annan del av staden, essays (1990)
 Den kluvna spegeln, reportage (1991)
 En lektion i pardans, novel (1993)
 Theres, novel (1996)
 "Allt förgängligt är bara en bild", novel (1999)
 Prag (no exit), essays (2002)
 Ravensbrück, novel (2003)
 Härifrån till Allmänningen, novel (2005)
 The Emperor of Lies (2009, published in translation 2011)
 "Tre romaner" (2011)
The Chosen Ones (Swedish: De utvalda, 2014), published in translation 2016
The Tempest (Swedish: Stormen,  2016), published in translation 2019
W. A novel (Swedish: W., 2019), published in translation 2022

References

 
 

1958 births
Living people
Swedish emigrants to Norway
Swedish journalists
20th-century Swedish novelists
Swedish non-fiction writers
Swedish translators
Dobloug Prize winners
August Prize winners
Swedish male novelists
International Writing Program alumni
21st-century Swedish novelists
Prix Médicis étranger winners
Male non-fiction writers
Members of the Swedish Academy